Laurence Sullivan (born 1992) is an English author of short stories, flash fiction, and haiku poetry. He grew up in Malvern, Worcestershire, and acquired his bachelor's degree from University of Kent and his master's degree from the Shakespeare Institute, University of Birmingham.

Sullivan is the author of over forty short stories. As a runner-up in the Wicked Young Writer Awards: Gregory Maguire Award 2016, he has been published online, in multiple magazines and various anthologies. Sullivan has, also, been nominated for multiple awards.

Poetry and prose

Awards
 73rd Basho Memorial Haiku Competition (Honourable Mention)
 Wicked Young Writer Awards: Gregory Maguire Award 2016 (Runner-up/Highly Commended)
 Writers' Centre Norwich Award (Shortlisted)
 Reedsy First Chapter Award (Shortlisted)
 Dante Rossetti Award 2015 (Finalist)

External links
 Official Website
 Poets & Writers Page
 Goodreads Author Page
 Interview with IdeasMag
 Interview with CSRfm

References

1992 births
Writers from Worcestershire
Living people